Manchester United Football Club is an English professional football club based in Old Trafford, Greater Manchester. The club was founded as Newton Heath LYR F.C. in 1878 and turned professional in 1885, before joining the Football League in 1892. After a brush with bankruptcy in 1901, the club reformed as Manchester United in 1902. Manchester United currently play in the Premier League, the top tier of English football. They have not been out of the top tier since 1975, and they have never been lower than the second tier. They have also been involved in European football ever since they became the first English club to enter the European Cup in 1956.

This list encompasses the major honours won by Manchester United and records set by the club, their managers and their players. The player records section includes details of the club's leading goalscorers and those who have made most appearances in first-team competitions. It also records notable achievements by Manchester United players on the international stage, and the highest transfer fees paid and received by the club. The club's attendance records, both at Old Trafford, their home since 1910, and Maine Road, their temporary home from 1946 to 1949, are also included in the list.

The club currently holds the record for the most Premier League titles with 13, and the highest number of English top-flight titles with 20. The club's record appearance maker is Ryan Giggs, who made 963 appearances between 1991 and 2014, and the club's record goalscorer is Wayne Rooney, who scored 253 goals in 559 appearances between 2004 and 2017.

Honours

Manchester United's first trophy was the Manchester Cup, which they won as Newton Heath LYR in 1886. Their first national senior honour came in 1908, when they won the 1907–08 Football League First Division title. The club also won the FA Cup for the first time the following year. In terms of the number of trophies won, the 1990s were Manchester United's most successful decade, during which they won five league titles, four FA Cups, one League Cup, five Charity Shields (one shared), one Champions League, one Cup Winners' Cup, one Super Cup and one Intercontinental Cup.

The club currently holds the record for most top-division titles, with 20. They were also the first team to win the Premier League, as well as holding the record for the most Premier League titles (13), and became the first English team to win the European Cup when they won it in 1968. Their most recent trophy came in February 2023, when they won the EFL Cup.

Domestic

League
 First Division / Premier League (Level 1): 20 – record
1907–08, 1910–11, 1951–52, 1955–56, 1956–57, 1964–65, 1966–67, 1992–93, 1993–94, 1995–96, 1996–97, 1998–99, 1999–2000, 2000–01, 2002–03, 2006–07, 2007–08, 2008–09, 2010–11, 2012–13
 Second Division (Level 2): 2
1935–36, 1974–75

Cups
 FA Cup: 12
1908–09, 1947–48, 1962–63, 1976–77, 1982–83, 1984–85, 1989–90, 1993–94, 1995–96, 1998–99, 2003–04, 2015–16
 League/EFL Cup: 6
1991–92, 2005–06, 2008–09, 2009–10, 2016–17, 2022–23
 FA Charity/Community Shield: 21 (17 outright, 4 shared) – record
1908, 1911, 1952, 1956, 1957, 1965*, 1967*, 1977*, 1983, 1990*, 1993, 1994, 1996, 1997, 2003, 2007, 2008, 2010, 2011, 2013, 2016 (* joint holders)

European
 European Cup / UEFA Champions League: 3
1967–68, 1998–99, 2007–08
 European Cup Winners' Cup: 1
1990–91
 UEFA Europa League: 1
2016–17
 European Super Cup: 1
1991

Worldwide
 Intercontinental Cup: 1
1999
 FIFA Club World Cup: 1
2008

Players

All current players are in boldAll stats accurate as of match played 26 February 2023

Appearances
 Youngest first-team player: David Gaskell –  (against Manchester City, Charity Shield, 24 October 1956)
 Oldest first-team player: Billy Meredith –  (against Derby County, First Division, 7 May 1921)
 Oldest post-Second World War player: Edwin van der Sar –  (against Barcelona, UEFA Champions League, 28 May 2011)
 Most consecutive League appearances: 206 – Steve Coppell, 15 January 1977 – 7 November 1981
 Shortest appearance: 11 seconds – Chris Smalling v Norwich City, Premier League, 26 February 2012

Most appearances
Competitive, professional matches only. Appearances as substitute (in parentheses) included in total.

Goalscorers

 Most goals in a season in all competitions: 46 – Denis Law, 1963–64
 Most League goals in a season: 32 – Dennis Viollet, Division 1, 1959–60
 Most League goals in a 38-game season: 31 – Cristiano Ronaldo, Premier League, 2007–08
 Top League scorer with fewest goals in a season: 6
 Bobby Charlton, 1972–73
 Sammy McIlroy, 1973–74
 Most goals scored in a match: 6
 Harold Halse v Swindon Town, 25 September 1911
 George Best v Northampton Town, 7 February 1970
 Goals in consecutive league matches: 10 consecutive matches – Ruud van Nistelrooy, 22 March 2003 to 23 August 2003
 Fastest goal: 12 seconds – Bryan Robson v Burnley, League Cup, 26 September 1984
 Fastest hat-trick: 4 minutes – Ernie Goldthorpe v Notts County, Second Division, 10 February 1923
 Fastest four goals: 13 minutes – Ole Gunnar Solskjær v Nottingham Forest, Premier League, 6 February 1999
 Most hat-tricks: 18 – Denis Law (3 November 1962 – 17 April 1971)

Overall scorers
Competitive, professional matches only, appearances including substitutes appear in brackets.

Award winners

Ballon d'Or

The following players have won the Ballon d'Or while playing for Manchester United:
 Denis Law – 1964
 Bobby Charlton – 1966
 George Best – 1968
 Cristiano Ronaldo – 2008

European Golden Shoe

The following players have won the European Golden Shoe while playing for Manchester United:
 Cristiano Ronaldo (31 goals) – 2008

FIFA World Player of the Year

The following players have won the FIFA World Player of the Year award while playing for Manchester United:
 Cristiano Ronaldo – 2008

UEFA Club Footballer of the Year

The following players have won the UEFA Club Footballer of the Year award while playing for Manchester United:
 David Beckham – 1999
 Cristiano Ronaldo – 2008

FIFA Puskás Award

The following players have won the FIFA Puskás Award while playing for Manchester United:
 Cristiano Ronaldo – 2009

Internationals

 First international: Jack Powell and Tom Burke for Wales against England (26 February 1887)
 All nine of Newton Heath's international players played for Wales. The first non-Welshman to be capped, and the first after the club's change of name to Manchester United, was Charlie Roberts, who was capped for England against Ireland on 25 February 1905.
 Most international caps (total): 196 – Cristiano Ronaldo – Portugal (82 while with the club)
 Most international caps as a United player: 106 – Bobby Charlton – England

International honours won while playing at Manchester United
Figures for active players in bold. Last updated 18 December 2022

FIFA World Cup
The following players have won the FIFA World Cup while playing for Manchester United:

 Bobby Charlton – 1966
 John Connelly – 1966
 Nobby Stiles – 1966
 Paul Pogba – 2018
 Lisandro Martínez – 2022

FIFA Confederations Cup
The following players have won the FIFA Confederations Cup while playing for Manchester United:
 Mikaël Silvestre – 2001, 2003

UEFA European Championship
The following players have won the UEFA European Championship while playing for Manchester United:
 Peter Schmeichel – 1992
 Fabien Barthez – 2000

UEFA Nations League
The following players have won the UEFA Nations League while playing for Manchester United:
 Anthony Martial – 2021
 Paul Pogba – 2021
 Raphaël Varane – 2021

Copa América
The following players have won the Copa América while playing for Manchester United:
 Kléberson – 2004

CONCACAF Gold Cup
The following players have won the CONCACAF Gold Cup while playing for Manchester United:
 Javier Hernández – 2011

Olympic Games
The following players have won a gold medal in football at the Olympic Games while playing for  Manchester United:
 Harold Hardman – 1908
 Gabriel Heinze – 2004

Transfers

Highest transfer fees paid
Manchester United's record signing is Paul Pogba, who signed for the club from Juventus for a world record fee of £89.3 million in August 2016. The signing of Anthony Martial for £36 million in 2015 set a world record for the transfer of a teenager, and the £80 million paid for Harry Maguire in 2019 was a world record for a defender.

Progression of record fee paid

The first transfer for which Manchester United (then Newton Heath) had to pay a fee was the transfer of Gilbert Godsmark from Ashford in January 1900, paying £40 for the forward.} The club's first £1,000 transfer came in 1910, when they signed Leslie Hofton from Glossop. When the club signed Tommy Taylor from Barnsley in 1953, the fee was intended to be £30,000. However, Matt Busby did not want to burden the young player with the "£30,000-man" tag, and Barnsley agreed for the fee to be reduced by £1 to £29,999. Busby then took the extra pound from his wallet and gave it to the lady who had been serving the teas.

Manchester United made their first six-figure signing in August 1962 with the transfer of Denis Law from Torino for £110,000, a new British record. The club broke the British transfer record again in 1981 with the £1.5 million signing of Bryan Robson from West Bromwich Albion. When Andy Cole signed for United in January 1995, the club paid £7 million, almost double their previous record of £3.75 million, which they paid for Roy Keane 18 months earlier. In the summer of 2001, the club broke their transfer record twice in the space of a month, first paying PSV Eindhoven £19 million for Ruud van Nistelrooy, and then £28.1 million to Lazio for Juan Sebastián Verón. Manchester United have broken the British transfer record three times since buying Verón, with the signings of Rio Ferdinand in July 2002, Ángel Di María in August 2014 and Paul Pogba in August 2016.

Transfers in bold are also records for fees paid by British clubs

Highest transfer fees received

The club's record sale came in July 2009, when they sold Cristiano Ronaldo to Real Madrid for £80 million.

Progression of record fee received
The first player for whom Manchester United, then Newton Heath, received a fee was William Bryant, who moved to Blackburn Rovers for just £50 in April 1900. That same month, Manchester City paid five times more for Scottish forward Joe Cassidy. The club's first £1,000 sale came 12 years later with the sale of Harold Halse to Aston Villa.

The club's first British record sale came in March 1949, when Derby County paid £24,500 for Johnny Morris. However, 35 years passed before Manchester United next broke the record for the biggest sale by a British club; the sale of Ray Wilkins to Milan for £1.5 million in June 1984 was also the club's first million-pound sale. Another British record followed two years later with the sale of Mark Hughes to Barcelona for £2.5 million. The club's record sale increased fivefold in the space of two transfers over the next 15 years; first with the £7 million sale of Paul Ince to Internazionale in 1995, and then the 2001 transfer of Jaap Stam to Lazio for £15.25 million. Manchester United broke the world transfer record for the first time in July 2009 with the £80 million sale of Cristiano Ronaldo to Real Madrid.

Transfers in bold are also British record transfers

Managerial records

 First full-time manager: Jack Robson – Robson was manager of Manchester United for 6 years and 10 months, starting on 28 December 1914, before pneumonia forced his retirement in October 1921.
 Longest-serving manager: Sir Alex Ferguson – 26 years, 194 days (1,500 matches; 6 November 1986 to 19 May 2013)

Team records

Matches
 First competitive match: Newton Heath 2–7 Blackburn Olympic Reserves, Lancashire Cup, 27 October 1883
 First FA Cup match: Fleetwood Rangers 2–2 Newton Heath, first round, 30 October 1886
 First Combination match: Newton Heath 4–3 Darwen, 22 September 1888
 First Football Alliance match: Newton Heath 4–1 Sunderland Albion, 21 September 1889
 First Football League match: Blackburn Rovers 4–3 Newton Heath, 3 September 1892
 First match at Old Trafford: Manchester United 3–4 Liverpool, 19 February 1910
 First European match: Anderlecht 0–2 Manchester United, European Cup preliminary round, first leg, 12 September 1956
 First League Cup match: Exeter City 1–1 Manchester United, first round, 19 October 1960

Record wins
Record win: 10–0 v Anderlecht, European Cup preliminary round, second leg, 26 September 1956
Record League win:
10–1 v Wolverhampton Wanderers, First Division, 15 October 1892
9–0 v Walsall, Second Division, 3 April 1895
9–0 v Darwen, Second Division, 24 December 1898
9–0 v Ipswich Town, Premier League, 4 March 1995
9–0 v Southampton, Premier League, 2 February 2021
Record FA Cup win: 8–0 v Yeovil Town, 12 February 1949
Record European win: 10–0 v Anderlecht, European Cup preliminary round, second leg, 26 September 1956
Record Champions League win: 7–1 v Roma, Champions League quarter-final, second leg, 10 April 2007
Record home win 10–0 v Anderlecht, European Cup preliminary round, second leg, 26 September 1956
Record away win:
7–0 v Grimsby Town, Second Division, 26 December 1899
8–1 v Nottingham Forest, Premier League, 6 February 1999

Record defeats
 Record defeat: 0–7
v Blackburn Rovers, First Division, 10 April 1926
v Aston Villa, First Division, 27 December 1930
v Wolverhampton Wanderers, Second Division, 26 December 1931
v Liverpool, Premier League, 5 March 2023
Record League defeat: 0–7
v Blackburn Rovers, First Division, 10 April 1926
v Aston Villa, First Division, 27 December 1930
v Wolverhampton Wanderers, Second Division, 26 December 1931
v Liverpool, Premier League, 5 March 2023
Record Premier League defeat:
0–7 v Liverpool, 5 March 2023
Record FA Cup defeat:
1–7 v Burnley, first round, 13 February 1901
0–6 v Sheffield Wednesday, second round, 20 February 1904
Record European defeat: 0–5 v Sporting CP, Cup Winners' Cup quarter-final, 18 March 1964
Record home defeat:
0–6 v Aston Villa, First Division, 14 March 1914
1–7 v Newcastle United, First Division, 10 September 1927
0–6 v Huddersfield Town, First Division, 10 September 1930
Record away defeat: 0–7
v Blackburn Rovers, First Division, 10 April 1926
v Aston Villa, First Division, 27 December 1930
v Wolverhampton Wanderers, Second Division, 26 December 1931
v Liverpool, Premier League, 5 March 2023

Streaks
 Longest unbeaten run (all major competitions): 45 matches, 26 December 1998 to 3 October 1999
 Longest unbeaten run (League): 29 matches
 26 December 1998 to 25 September 1999
 11 April 2010 to 5 February 2011
 Longest unbeaten home run (League): 36 matches, 26 December 1998 to 17 December 2000
Longest unbeaten away run (League): 29 matches, 17 February 2020 to 16 October 2021
Longest winning streak (League): 14 matches, 15 October 1904 to 3 January 1905
 Longest losing streak (League): 14 matches, 26 April 1930 to 25 October 1930
 Longest drawing streak (League): 6 matches, 30 October 1988 to 27 November 1988
 Longest streak without a win (League): 16 matches, 19 April 1930 to 25 October 1930
 Longest scoring run (League): 36 matches, 3 December 2007 to 15 November 2008
 Longest non-scoring run (League): 5 matches, 22 February 1902 to 17 March 1902; 7 February 1981 to 14 March 1981
 Longest streak without conceding a goal (League): 14 matches, 15 November 2008 to 18 February 2009

Wins/draws/losses in a season
 Most wins in a league season: 28 – 1905–06, 1956–57, 1999–2000, 2006–07, 2008–09, 2011–12, 2012–13
 Most draws in a league season: 18 – 1980–81
 Most defeats in a league season: 27 – 1930–31
 Fewest wins in a league season: 6 – 1892–93, 1893–94
 Fewest draws in a league season: 2 – 1893–94
 Fewest defeats in a league season: 3 – 1998–99, 1999–2000

Goals
 Most League goals scored in a season: 103 – 1956–57, 1958–59
 Most Premier League goals scored in a season: 97 – 1999–2000
 Fewest League goals scored in a season: 36 – 1893–94
 Most League goals conceded in a season: 115 – 1930–31
 Fewest League goals conceded in a season: 22 – 2007–08

Points
 Most points in a season:
Two points for a win: 64 in 42 matches, First Division, 1956–57
Three points for a win:
92 in 42 matches, Premier League, 1993–94
91 in 38 matches, Premier League, 1999–2000
 Fewest points in a season:
Two points for a win:
22 in 42 matches, First Division, 1930–31
14 in 30 matches, First Division, 1893–94
Three points for a win: 48 in 38 matches, First Division, 1989–90

Attendances
 Highest home attendance: 83,260 v Arsenal at Maine Road, First Division, 17 January 1948
 Highest home attendance at Old Trafford: 76,098 v Blackburn Rovers, 31 March 2007
 Highest away attendance: 135,000 v Real Madrid, European Cup, 11 April 1957
 Lowest post-War home league attendance: 8,456 v Stoke City at Maine Road, First Division, 5 February 1947

Season-by-season performance

League record by opponent

Footnotes

A.  Between 1949 and 1993, when the Charity Shield finished in a draw, the Shield would be shared by the two teams. In the 1980s and early 1990s, the Shield itself was held by each club for six months.
B.  The Premier League took over from the First Division as the top tier of the English football league system upon its formation in 1992. The First Division then became the second tier of English football, the Second Division became the third tier, and so on. The First Division is now known as the Football League Championship, while the Second Division is now known as Football League One.
C.  The "Other" column constitutes goals and appearances in the FA Community Shield, the UEFA Super Cup, the Intercontinental Cup and the FIFA Club World Cup.
D.  Major competitions include the Premier League, the FA Cup, the League Cup and the UEFA Champions League.
E.  Due to bomb damage to Old Trafford, in the period between the end of the Second World War and 1949, Manchester United played their home games at Maine Road, the home of Manchester City, with the exception of two FA Cup matches in the 1947–48 season, which were played at Goodison Park, Liverpool, and Leeds Road, Huddersfield, respectively.
F.  Barthez had just sealed his move from Monaco before the tournament had begun and had yet to make his United debut.

References
Bibliography

References

External links
StretfordEnd.co.uk

Manchester United
Records and Statistics